Biomarker Insights is a peer-reviewed open access academic journal focusing on biomarkers and their clinical applications. The journal aims to be a venue for rapid communications in the field. The journal was established in 2006 and was originally published by Libertas Academica. SAGE Publications became the publisher in September 2016. The editor in chief is Karen Pulford.

Indexing
The journal is indexed in:

References

External links

Biochemistry journals
Publications established in 2006
English-language journals
SAGE Publishing academic journals
Open access journals